Chester Presbyterian Church is a historic Presbyterian church located at the junction of Osborne Road and VA 10 in Chester, Chesterfield County, Virginia.  It was built in 1880, and is a wood-frame structure measuring 20 by 30 feet and is covered by a steeply pitched gable roof with relatively deep, unornamented eaves.  It is an elementary expression of American Gothic Revival architecture. The belfry was reconstructed after being blown off in 1948. The church was moved to its present site in 1954, from the east side of Winfree Street at the intersection with Gill Street in Chester.

It was listed on the National Register of Historic Places in 1976.

References

Presbyterian churches in Virginia
Churches on the National Register of Historic Places in Virginia
Carpenter Gothic church buildings in Virginia
Churches completed in 1880
Buildings and structures in Chesterfield County, Virginia
National Register of Historic Places in Chesterfield County, Virginia